The 2018–19 Phoenix mayoral special election was held to elect the new Mayor of Phoenix, Arizona. The election was officially nonpartisan; candidates ran on the same ballot. In the initial round of the election, since no candidate reached 50 percent plus one vote (as required by Phoenix City Charter), a runoff election was held between the top two finishers.

In October 2017, then incumbent mayor Greg Stanton announced that he was running for United States Congress in District 9, which includes much of Phoenix. Stanton resigned effective May 29, 2018, triggering a special election on November 6, 2018. The top two candidates from that election, Kate Gallego and Daniel Valenzuela, both fell short of the required 50 percent of the vote, therefore the mayoral race was decided by a final runoff election on March 12, 2019, which Gallego won.

Phoenix councilwoman Thelda Williams served as temporary mayor until Gallego took office.

Candidates

Declared
 Kate Gallego, former Phoenix City Councilwoman, District 8 (Democratic)
 Moses Sanchez, Navy veteran, businessman, former local high school board member  (Republican)
 Nicholas Sarwark, attorney and chair of the Libertarian National Committee (Libertarian)
 Daniel Valenzuela, former Phoenix City Councilman, District 5  (Democratic)

Not Qualified For Ballot
 Tim Seay, freemason and businessman

Withdrew
 Michael Lafferty, businessman (Independent)

Declined
 Sal DiCiccio, Phoenix City councilman, District 6 (Republican)
 Michael Nowakowski, Phoenix City Councilman, District 7 (Democratic)
 Tom Simplot, former Phoenix City Councilman (Independent)
 Laura Pastor, Phoenix City councilman, District 4 (Democrat)

Polling

* Denotes candidates who did not enter the race.

Endorsements

Results

References

External links
 City of Phoenix Official Website – Election results
 City of Phoenix Mayor Candidates – Resource 
 Kate Gallego (D) for Mayor
 Daniel Valenzuela (D) for Mayor

Phoenix mayoral
Mayoral elections in Phoenix, Arizona
Phoenix
Phoenix
Phoenix
Phoenix
Phoenix mayoral 2018–19